George Diab is a Lebanese actor and voice actor.

Filmography

Film
 Very Sweet and a Liar. 2013

Television
 Nos Youm. 2016
 Cello. 2015
 Chawareh Al Zill. 2013
 Sweet and a Liar. 2012
 Hotel Al Afrah. 2012
 Khataya Saghira. 2005
 Secretairit Baba. 2000

Plays
 Waylon Le Omma - Lawyer. 2013

Dubbing roles
Adventure Time - Ice King
Cars - Doc Hudson (Classical Arabic version)
Cars 2 - Francesco Bernoulli (Classical Arabic version)
Dinosaur - Yar (Classical Arabic version)
Finding Nemo - Mr. Ray, Mr. Johansen, Bloat, Gerald (Classical Arabic version)
Inside Out (2015 film) - Anger
Monsters University - Brock Pearson
Mr. Bean
Over the Garden Wall (miniseries) - The Woodsman
The Incredibles - Gilbert Huph (Classical Arabic version)

References 
 General
http://www.imdb.com/name/nm8030920/
http://www.elfann.com/news/show/1049608/جورج-دياب-للنشرة-رميونا-سنة-وأتمنى-منهم-عدم-تقليد-
http://bisara7a.com/بالصور-الممثل-اللبناني-جورج-دياب-لـ-هل/
http://bisara7a.com/رأي-خاص-جورج-دياب-ومارسيل-مارينا-أثريا/
http://www.elcinema.com/en/person/1027589
http://www.elfilm.com/name/4613646

 Specific

External links 
 

Lebanese male actors
Lebanese male voice actors
20th-century Lebanese male actors
21st-century Lebanese male actors
Living people
Year of birth missing (living people)